Pat King (1944–2022) was a Scottish bassist known for his association with Manfred Mann's Earth Band

Pat or Patrick King may also refer to:

 Pat King (Gaelic footballer) (1947–2015), Irish Gaelic football full-back
 Patrick King (basketball) (born 1970), German basketball small forward
 Pat King (activist) (born 1977/1978), Canadian far-right activist
 Patrick King, member of the American boy band Natural